The 12941 / 42 Parasnath Express is a Superfast Express train belonging to Indian Railways Western Zone that runs between  and  in India.From 20 December, 2022, it runs with highly refurbished LHB coaches.

It operates as train number 12941 from Bhavnagar Terminus to Asansol and as train number 12942 in the reverse direction, serving the states of Gujarat, Madhya Pradesh, Rajasthan, Uttar Pradesh, Bihar, Jharkhand, and West Bengal.

Coaches
The 12941 / 42 Parasnath Express has 2 AC 2-tier, 6 AC 3-tier 8 sleeper class, four general unreserved, one EOG & one SLR (seating with luggage rake).  It does not carry a pantry car coach.

As is customary with most train services in India, coach composition may be amended at the discretion of Indian Railways depending on demand.

Service

As the average speed of the train is above , as per railway rules, its fare includes a Superfast surcharge.

Routing

Traction
It is hauled by Vadodara-based WAP-7 for its entire journey.

Rake sharing
The train shares its rake with 22963/22964 Bandra Terminus–Bhavnagar Terminus Weekly Superfast Express.

References

External links
12941 Parasnath Express at India Rail Info
12942 Parasnath Express at India Rail Info

Express trains in India
Transport in Bhavnagar
Rail transport in Gujarat
Rail transport in Madhya Pradesh
Rail transport in Rajasthan
Rail transport in Uttar Pradesh
Rail transport in Bihar
Rail transport in Jharkhand
Rail transport in West Bengal
Transport in Asansol
Named passenger trains of India